Carriganima or Carriganimmy is a village in the Barony of Muskerry, County Cork, Ireland, situated approximately 11 km northwest of Macroom and 10 km south of Millstreet. The village lies in a valley between the Boggeragh and Derrynasaggart mountain ranges. 

Local townlands include Carriganima (Carraig an Ime), Knockraheen (Cnoc Raithín), Cusloura (Cois Labhra), Glendav (Gleann Daimh) ,Glantane East & West (Gleanntán) and Moanflugh (An Muine Fliuch). Carriganimmy is within the Cork North-West Dáil constituency.

Notable people

Carriganima is the homeplace of the famous Irish language writer and Catholic priest, an t-Athair Peadar Ua Laoghaire, who was born in the townland of Liscarrigane (Lios Carragáin) and attended Carriganima National School.

Art O'Leary met his poetic martyrdom in Carriganima on the 4th of May, 1773.

Cornelius E. "Con" Walsh - bronze medal winner in the hammer throw while representing Canada at the 1908 Summer Olympics.

See also
 List of towns and villages in Ireland

References

External links
 Carriganima Whiteboys

Towns and villages in County Cork